Michael Spielmann (born 23 January 1970) is a German speed skater. He competed in three events at the 1994 Winter Olympics.

References

External links
 

1970 births
Living people
German male speed skaters
Olympic speed skaters of Germany
Speed skaters at the 1994 Winter Olympics
Speed skaters from Berlin